Kevin Cook is an American former professional tennis player.

Cook, a native of Midland, Michigan, played collegiate tennis for the University of Florida, earning All-SEC selection in 1979. His professional tennis career included a doubles main draw appearance at the 1981 French Open.

ATP Challenger finals

Doubles: 1 (0–1)

References

External links
 
 

Year of birth missing (living people)
Living people
American male tennis players
Florida Gators men's tennis players
Tennis people from Michigan
Sportspeople from Midland, Michigan
20th-century American people